Brent Colm McGrath (born 18 June 1991) is a former Australian international football (soccer) player who currently plays as a striker for Bentleigh Greens in the National Premier Leagues.

Born in Sydney, McGrath played youth football for Brøndby before making his professional debut for the club in 2010. In 2013, Brent returned to Australia, playing for Adelaide United and Bentleigh Greens before spending time in the Thai Premier League. In 2015, he returned to Denmark with FC Fredericia before moving to Esbjerg fB one season later.

McGrath made one appearance for the Australian national team, a win over Germany in 2011.

Junior Representative to International
Brent was recognized very early as a player of great potential. Whilst playing for Sydney United in the NSW Premier Youth League competition, he stood out as a player of the future. As a young 14-year-old, Brent was selected in the NSW state team where his skills were being enhanced - getting him ready for the higher levels he was destined for. Even at this early stage, a very young and humble young man had his feet squarely planted on the ground. The early stages of the "U/14 Friendship Games" in 2005  were not the best for Brent, but he found his way in time for the end of that tournament to be noticed by Ange Postecoglou and would eventually go on to become the youngest 'Joey' at the time (for the U/17 FIFA World Cup qualifiers in Laos, 2006)

Club career
McGrath signed for Brøndby IF in 2010.
On 22 March 2010, McGrath made his senior debut for the Brøndby first team against Randers, coming on as a 65th-minute substitute for Peter Madsen.

McGrath scored his first goal for the club in October 2010 against FC Nordsjælland in a 1–1 draw in the Danish Superliga.

Following his departure from Denmark, McGrath flew to Melbourne to trial with A-League club Melbourne Victory ahead of the 2013-14 season, but eventually signed for Adelaide United

On 20 August 2015, McGrath signed a one-year contract with the Danish 1st Division club FC Fredericia.

McGrath signed a three-year deal with Danish Superliga side Esbjerg fB in May 2016. He was loaned back to Fredericia in his second season at the club. McGrath left Denmark and Esbjerg at the end of the 2018/19 season, where his contract expired.

On 6 July 2019, McGrath joined newly promoted Danish 1st Division club Kolding IF. He scored on his competitive debut for the club, a win over Dalum IF in the 2019–20 Danish Cup on 7 August 2019. McGrath left Kolding to return to Australia in September 2019.

McGrath returned to Australia to join National Premier Leagues Victoria club Bentleigh Greens in December 2019.

International career
McGrath received his first Socceroos call up by coach Holger Osieck for a friendly against Germany. He came on as a substitute for Brett Holman in time added on in Australia's 2-1 victory.

Career statistics

Club

Honours

Club
Bentleigh Greens
FV Community Shield: 2020

References

External links
 

1991 births
Living people
Soccer players from Sydney
Australian people of Irish descent
Australia under-20 international soccer players
Australia international soccer players
Association football forwards
Brøndby IF players
Adelaide United FC players
Bentleigh Greens SC players
Brent McGrath
Brent McGrath
FC Fredericia players
Esbjerg fB players
Danish Superliga players
A-League Men players
National Premier Leagues players
Brent McGrath
Danish 1st Division players
Australian expatriate soccer players
Expatriate men's footballers in Denmark
Australian expatriate sportspeople in Denmark
Australian expatriate sportspeople in Thailand
Expatriate footballers in Thailand
Australian soccer players